La Cortinada is a village in Andorra, located between the villages of Arans and Ansalonga in the parish of Ordino.

Main sights
In the centre of the village is a 12th-century Romanesque church Sant Martí de la Cortinada; the 17th and 18th century extensions include wrought iron railings made from iron that was forged in Andorra.

References

Populated places in Andorra
Ordino